The Reconciliation of Esau and Jacob is a 1624 painting by Peter Paul Rubens. Originally in the Spanish royal collection, it was sent to Germany by Maria Anna of Neuburg (wife of Charles II of Spain) to her brother Johann Wilhelm. It is now in the Staatsgalerie Schleissheim near Munich.

It shows the biblical story of meeting between Jacob and Esau. It was the model for a painting by Abraham Willemsen.

This painting was featured in Willem van Haecht's Gallery of Cornelis van der Geest with Joseph and Potiphar's wife, 1630s.

External links

1624 paintings
Paintings by Peter Paul Rubens
Paintings depicting Jacob
Sheep in art
Cattle in art
Horses in art
Birds in art
Paintings in Bavaria
Esau
Paintings formerly in the Spanish royal collection